Michael Schumacher is a German former racing driver who won seven Formula One world championships. Following this race, he was signed by Benetton for the rest of the season. His first Grand Prix win came the following year at the same venue as his debut race. His victory was controversial, as he was involved in a collision with fellow championship contender Damon Hill at the final race in Adelaide. Both drivers had to retire their cars which resulted in Schumacher securing the championship. He won his second championship the following year, winning nine races, and became the youngest double world champion at the time.

He finished third in the championship, winning three races, in a season dominated by the Williams team. The following year, he won six races. His  season, in which he was on the podium in every race, included eleven race victories. The latter broke the record for the most wins in a single season. Schumacher surpassed this with thirteen race victories in 2004. His final Grand Prix win was at the 2006 Chinese Grand Prix; at the end of that season he retired from Formula One.

Schumacher is currently the driver with the second-highest number of victories, having won 91 out of 306 races in his career; the majority of his race victories were for the Ferrari team with 72. His most successful circuit was Magny-Cours where he won eight times in his career. Schumacher's largest margin of victory was at the 1994 Brazilian Grand Prix, a race in which he lapped the field, and the smallest margin of victory was at the 2000 Canadian Grand Prix when he beat teammate Rubens Barrichello by 0.174 seconds.

Wins
Key:
 No. – Victory number; for example, "1" signifies Schumacher's first race win.
 Race – Grand prix entries number in Schumacher's Formula One career; for example "36" signifies Schumacher's 36th Formula One grand prix entries.
 Grid – The position on the grid from which Schumacher started the race.
 Margin – Margin of victory, given in the format of minutes:seconds.milliseconds
  – Driver's Championship winning season.

Number of wins at different Grands Prix

Schumacher won at 22 out of 30 different Grands Prix in which he participated. The Abu Dhabi Grand Prix, the Indian Grand Prix, the Korean Grand Prix, the Luxembourg Grand Prix, the Mexican Grand Prix, the Singapore Grand Prix, the South African Grand Prix and the Turkish Grand Prix are the events he entered and did not win.

Number of wins at different circuits
Schumacher won at 23 out of 34 different circuits he competed on. The Adelaide Street Circuit, the Autódromo Hermanos Rodríguez, the Buddh International Circuit, the Circuit of the Americas, the Donington Park, the Istanbul Park, the Korea International Circuit, the Kyalami Circuit, the Marina Bay Street Circuit, the Valencia Street Circuit and the Yas Marina Circuit are the circuits on which he drove but did not win.

See also
 List of Formula One Grand Prix winners

Notes

References

External links 
 Drivers: Hall of Fame: Michael Schumacher
 Michael Schumacher: Involvement from Stats F1

Michael Schumacher
Schumacher, Michael
1990s in motorsport
1990s-related lists
2000s in motorsport
2000s-related lists